Eupithecia christophi is a moth in the family Geometridae. It is found in southern Transcaucasia.

References

Moths described in 1988
christophi
Moths of Asia